Losuia is a village on Kiriwina Island, part of the Kiriwina Islands, Milne Bay Province, Papua New Guinea. It is served by Losuia Airport.

It is the name of the government station on the Kiriwina island.

Populated places in Milne Bay Province